Navicula baardsethii is a species of algae in the genus Navicula.

References

Further reading
 

baardsethii
Species described in 1949